Sripatum University (SPU; Thai: มหาวิทยาลัยศรีปทุม) is one of the oldest private universities in Bangkok, Thailand. Dr. Sook Pookayaporn established the university in 1970 under the name of Thai Suriya College. In 1987, the college was promoted to university status by the Ministry of University Affairs, and has since been known as Sripatum University.

"Sripatum" means the "Source of Knowledge Blooming Like a Lotus" and was conferred on the college by the Princess Mother Srinagarindra (Somdet  Phra Srinagarindra Baromarajajanan). She presided over the official opening ceremony of SPU and awarded vocational certificates to the first three graduating classes.

In 2002 Sripatum University was accredited by the International Standards Organisation (ISO9001:2000) for both undergraduate and graduate programs. Sripatum University offers 10 Schools & 6 Colleges

SIC offers 8 international academic programs taught in English:
International Business Management,
International Hospitality Management- A joint academic program with SHML in Switzerland,
International Logistic & Supply Chain Management,
Airline Business,
Media & Marketing Communication,
Accountancy,
Business Chinese - A dual-degree with Beijing Language & Culture University, PR.China,
Thai Studies.

External links
Sripatum University homepage
Sripatum University Khonkaen
Sripatum University Chonburi Campus

Universities and colleges in Bangkok
Private universities and colleges in Thailand
Educational institutions established in 1970
1970 establishments in Thailand
Universities in Thailand
Chatuchak district